Greenfield is a city in the U.S. state of Wisconsin. Located in Milwaukee County, Greenfield is one of many bedroom communities in the Milwaukee metropolitan area. The population was 37,803 as of the 2020 Census.

History
On March 8, 1839, the Town of Kinnikennick was created by the territorial legislature, encompassing the western part of the Town of Lake); and on December 20, 1839, the south portion of the Town of Kinnikennick was split off to form the town of Franklin. As of the 1840 census, the population of the Town of Kinnikennick or Kinnikinnick was 404.

On February 19, 1841, the name of the town was changed to Greenfield, taking its name from the name of the Post Office in the Town of Kinnickinnic. Greenfield was the final municipality in Milwaukee County to incorporate, and was the final municipality to leave the Town form of government in 1957. This was done to prevent total annexation by the City of Milwaukee. Before 1957, Milwaukee slowly nibbled away at Greenfield's land.

Geography

Greenfield is located at  (42.963034, −87.995943). The Root River flows through the western part of the city.

Climate

Demographics

2010 census
As of the census of 2010, there were 36,720 people, 16,860 households, and 9,285 families living in the city. The racial makeup of the city was 88.6% White, 2.3% African American, 0.7% Native American, 3.9% Asian, 2.2% from other races, and 2.3% from two or more races. Hispanic or Latino of any race were 8.4% of the population.

There were 16,860 households, of which 22.4% had children under the age of 18 living with them, 41.9% were married couples living together, 9.2% had a female householder with no husband present, 4.0% had a male householder with no wife present, and 44.9% were non-families. 37.5% of all households were made up of individuals, and 16.5% had someone living alone who was 65 years of age or older. The average household size was 2.13 and the average family size was 2.83.

The median age in the city was 44.4 years. 17.6% of residents were under the age of 18; 8% were between the ages of 18 and 24; 25.2% were from 25 to 44; 28.7% were from 45 to 64; and 20.5% were 65 years of age or older. The gender makeup of the city was 47.6% male and 52.4% female.

2000 census
As of the census of 2000, there were 35,476 people, 15,697 households, and 9,167 families living in the city. The population density was 3,072.5 people per square mile (1,185.9/km2). There were 16,203 housing units at an average density of 1,403.3 per square mile (541.6/km2). The racial makeup of the city was 93.72% White, 0.98% African American, 0.44% Native American, 2.26% Asian, 0.02% Pacific Islander, 1.31% from other races, and 1.28% from two or more races. Hispanic or Latino of any race were 3.88% of the population.

There were 15,697 households, out of which 22.6% had children under the age of 18 living with them, 47.3% were married couples living together, 8.0% had a female householder with no husband present, and 41.6% were non-families. 34.6% of all households were made up of individuals, and 14.4% had someone living alone who was 65 years of age or older. The average household size was 2.20 and the average family size was 2.87.

In the city, the population was spread out, with 18.9% under the age of 18, 8.1% from 18 to 24, 28.3% from 25 to 44, 24.3% from 45 to 64, and 20.5% who were 65 years of age or older. The median age was 42 years. For every 100 females, there were 88.4 males. For every 100 females age 18 and over, there were 84.7 males.

The median income for a household in the city was $44,230, and the median income for a family was $56,272. Males had a median income of $40,056 versus $30,212 for females. The per capita income for the city was $23,755. About 3.4% of families and 4.7% of the population were below the poverty line, including 6.9% of those under age 18 and 5.0% of those age 65 or over.

Notable people

 George G. Brew, politician
 Jon Dekker, professional football player
 Tyler Herro, professional Basketball player
 Dan Jansen, Olympic speed skater
 William Wallace Johnson, minister and politician
 Alan Kulwicki, NASCAR driver and 1992 NASCAR Winston Cup Series Champion
 Craig Kusick, professional baseball player
 Edmund T. Melms, politician
 Dan Nimmer, pianist for Wynton Marsalis
 Thomas O'Neill, politician
 Marjorie Peters, All-American Girls Professional Baseball League player born in Greenfield
 Robert Schmidt, politician
 Jeana Tomasino, Playmate of the Month in November 1980, actress, "Eliminator Girl" for ZZ Top music videos in the 1980s
 Matt Turk, professional football player and three-time Pro Bowl selection
 Bob Wieland, combat medic in Vietnam, amputee and marathoner; Greenfield High School baseball field was dedicated to him

References

External links
 City of Greenfield

Cities in Wisconsin
Cities in Milwaukee County, Wisconsin